Admiral Sir Robert Smart, KCB, KH (September 1796 – 10 September 1874) was a Royal Navy officer who went on to be Commander-in-Chief, Mediterranean Fleet.

Naval career

Smart joined the Royal Navy and was promoted to lieutenant in 1820. Promoted to captain in 1837, he took command, successively, of HMS Howe, HMS Impregnable, HMS Collingwood and HMS Indefatigable. He became captain superintendent of Pembroke Dockyard in 1854.

Promoted to rear admiral in July 1857, he became Commander-in-Chief, Channel Squadron in 1861 and Commander-in-Chief, Mediterranean Fleet in April 1863. He was promoted to vice admiral in December 1863 and was required to assess the damage caused by the volcanic disturbances in the neighbourhood of Santorini in Spring 1866 before handing over his command in April 1866.

He was promoted to full admiral in 1869 and retired the following year.

Family
Smart's daughter, Isabella Dora Smart, married first J. H. Anderson; and after his death she remarried in August 1902 Henry Francis Wilson, CMG, Colonial Secretary to the Orange River Colony.

See also

References

|-

1796 births
1874 deaths
Royal Navy admirals
Knights Commander of the Order of the Bath